Gogoșu is a commune in Dolj County, Oltenia, Romania with a population of 1,009 people. It is composed of three villages: Gogoșița, Gogoșu and Ștefănel.

References

Communes in Dolj County
Localities in Oltenia